Royce Waltman (January 8, 1942 – April 7, 2014) was an American college basketball coach.  He was the head coach at Indiana State University from 1997 to 2007; at the University of Indianapolis from 1992 to 1997 and the 2007–08 season and at DePauw University from 1988 to 1992.

He won 100 or more games at each school and led all three to the NCAA National Tournament; in addition, he led them all to conference regular and tournament championships.  His career collegiate record was: 337–263 (.562).

He was the color commentator for Indiana basketball broadcasts on radio. Waltman died at the age of 72 in 2014 after a period of declining health.

His influence and legacy is represented by the Waltman Coaching Tree consisting of Indiana State coach Greg Lansing, Clemson coach Brad Brownell, who played for him at DePauw; Southeast Missouri & former Mississippi State coach Rick Ray, who coached with Waltman at Indiana State; former UM-Kansas City coach Kareem Richardson, ISU-Evansville coach Stan Gouard and current University of Chicago coach Mike McGrath.  His former assistant Todd Sturgeon succeeded him at UIndy, spending 10 years leading the Greyhounds.  Long-time assistant Dick Bender is on Brownell's Clemson staff.

Coaching career

Indiana State

It took just three seasons for Royce Waltman to return the Sycamores to the spotlight, attracting national attention unlike that since the fabled 1978–79 team danced to the NCAA Championship game. He was named as the 1999–2000 Missouri Valley Conference Coach of The Year.

As if an encore was needed, Waltman, in his fourth season at Indiana State, he directed the 2000–01 Sycamores to their first MVC Tournament Championship since the 1978–79 campaign - leading Indiana State to consecutive NCAA Tournament appearances.  While Waltman will quickly deflect praise for what the 1999–2000 Sycamores accomplished as being due to the diligent efforts of his entire staff, the achievements which he and his program have attained certainly merit mention of the bold face, large type variety.  Be it a mid-December, 63–60, victory at Indiana to claim the Indiana Classic Championship or defeating the Hoosiers again – this time in Terre Haute, recording the University's first 20-win season in 21 years, claiming outright possession of Indiana State's first MVC regular-season title over that same 21-year span or directing the Sycamores to consecutive NCAA Div I Tournament appearances for the first time in the school's history, Waltman's dedication, or to use one of his favorite terms – passion – for his program and the game of basketball are nothing short of amazing.

During his ten seasons on the Sycamores’ sidelines, Waltman has produced 14 All-MVC
performers. In addition, 21 student-athletes have garnered MVC All-Academic plaudits.

Waltman's determination to produce a winning program became apparent in his initial two seasons as the Sycamores captured their first back-to-back winning seasons in 20 years.
Entering year number three, his Sycamores were picked to make a run for the 1999–2000 Missouri Valley Conference Championship.  And run they did, taking the outright MVC regular season title.  Winning games and quickly reversing the fortunes of struggling basketball
programs is the hallmark of this veteran coach. Prior to his arrival at Indiana State, Waltman spent the past decade resurrecting basketball programs at the University of Indianapolis and DePauw University.

Indianapolis
In his initial season at the helm of the Greyhounds, Waltman's squad posted the first winning season since the 1988 campaign, the most wins since 1972 and the most conference wins in
school history. That season also saw Waltman lead Indianapolis to then-school records
of eight GLVC victories and the championship of the Peach Basket Classic.  The following season his Greyhounds were nationally ranked for the first time in Division II, and he recorded back-to-back winning seasons for the first time in 23 years.

In 1995–96 Waltman's squad received the school's first-ever NCAA Division II Tournament bid after finishing 20–8 in the regular season.  Indianapolis recorded a school-record 14 wins in the Great Lakes Valley Conference, and Waltman was selected as the GLVC Coach-of-the-Year. His team posted the school's first postseason win in 32 years in the first round of the NCAA Division II tournament.  The Greyhounds were ranked 14th nationally at one point in the season.

In 1996–97, Waltman elevated his program to one of the premier basketball teams at the NCAA Division II level. The Greyhounds earned an in-season number-one ranking, eventually finishing as the No. 3 ranked team in the nation. Indianapolis captured the GLVC title with a school-record 23–5 record. For the second year, Waltman was selected by his peers as the GLVC Coach-of-the-Year, winning 16 games in conference and posting the school record winning
streak (18).  Waltman's 1996–97 Greyhounds also established school records for best NCAA Division II season record (23–5) and best NCAA Division II season winning percentage (.821).

Waltman's .645 winning percentage at Indianapolis ranks him as the second-winningest coach in the school's history.

DePauw
Prior to his stint at Indianapolis, Waltman was the head coach at DePauw University in Greencastle, Ind.  During his tenure at that Division III institution, he compiled a record of 100–36. His 1989–90 squad captured the Indiana Collegiate Athletic Conference championship and was national runners-up. His teams were ranked number-one in the nation during both the 1988–89 and 1990–91 seasons.

He earned Indiana Collegiate Athletic Conference (ICAC) Coach of the Year honors in 1990 after leading the Tigers to the league championship.  The 1991–92 team finished 20–7, making the school's third straight trip to the NCAA playoffs under his guidance. He led the Tigers to their first-ever NCAA Division III number-one ranking in January 1988, and his winning percentage of .730 is second in the school's history.

The 1989–90 team was inducted into the DePauw Athletic Hall of Fame in 2003.

High school
Prior to becoming a collegiate coach, Waltman spent 15 years as head coach at Bedford High School in Bedford, Pennsylvania.  During that tenure, he amassed an overall record of 276–110 and captured 11 league titles and seven district championships.

Coach Waltman returned to the high school ranks as an assistant coach; during the 2008–09 and 2009–10 seasons, he was on staff at Indianapolis Roncalli High School.  The Rebels were 31–13 during his stint, with one sectional title.

Head coaching record

References

1942 births
2014 deaths
American men's basketball coaches
American men's basketball players
American sports radio personalities
Basketball players from Maryland
Basketball coaches from Maryland
DePauw Tigers men's basketball coaches
High school basketball coaches in the United States
Indiana Hoosiers men's basketball coaches
Indianapolis Greyhounds men's basketball coaches
Indiana State Sycamores men's basketball coaches
People from Allegany County, Maryland
Pittsburgh Panthers men's basketball players
Slippery Rock men's basketball players